Samseong station is a railway station on the Gyeongbu Line, South Korea.

Railway stations in North Gyeongsang Province